Oakes Municipal Airport  is a public airport located 2.5 miles (4 km) north of the central business district of Oakes, a city in Dickey County, North Dakota, United States. It is owned by the Oakes Airport Authority.

Facilities and aircraft 
17/35 with a turf surface measuring 2,000 by 200 feet (610 x 61 m).

For the 12-month period ending November 3, 1997, the airport had 2,910 aircraft operations: 96% general aviation, 3% air taxi and <1% military.

References

External links 

Airports in North Dakota
Buildings and structures in Dickey County, North Dakota
Transportation in Dickey County, North Dakota